The 13th Annual Gotham Independent Film Awards, presented by the Independent Filmmaker Project, were held on September 22, 2003. The ceremony was hosted by Michael Ian Black. It was the first Gotham Awards ceremony where the individual awards such as the Filmmaker Award were replaced with Career Tributes resulting in several Tributes each year instead of one.

Winners and nominees

Career Tributes
 Steve Buscemi
 Glenn Close
 David Linde
 Edward R. Pressman

References

External links
 

2003
2003 film awards